What I Deserve is the fourth studio album by Kelly Willis, released more than six years after her eponymous album. The album was her highest on the Billboard country charts at #30. Three of the tracks were co-written with Gary Louris of The Jayhawks.

Track listing

Personnel
Kelly Willis - lead vocals, background vocals
Chuck Prophet - acoustic guitar, electric guitar, background vocals
Mark Spencer - acoustic guitar, electric guitar
John Dee Graham - electric guitar, lap steel guitar
Calvin Betton - electric guitar, acoustic guitar
Max Butler - electric guitar
Lloyd Maines - pedal steel guitar
Amy Noelle Farris - mandolin, violin, background vocals
Michael Ramos - piano, Hammond B-3 organ, Farfisa organ
John Ludwick - bass guitar, background vocals
Michael Been - bass guitar
Larry Aberman, Rafael Gayol - drums
Dave McNair - percussion
Bruce Robison, Charlie Robison - background vocals

Track information and credits adapted from Discogs and AllMusic, then verified from the album's liner notes.

Charts

References

Kelly Willis albums
1999 albums
Rykodisc albums